Nemat'o'llāh Gorji (30 March 1926, in Tehran – 5 April 2000, in Tehran) was an Iranian theatre and film actor of Georgian descent.

Gorji acted in at least 94 Iranian films, some of which have come to be ranked amongst the most celebrated Iranian films of the 1970s. His  last role was that of an old and kind-hearted gardener-caretaker in The Pear Tree (Derakht-e Golābi), 1998, directed by Dariush Mehrjui.

Filmography 
Mashti Mamdali's Car (1974)
Hostage (1974)
Youthful Days (1999-2000)
The Blue Veiled (1995)

See also 
 Bāgh-e Ferdows

References

External links 
 Home Page of Film Museum of Iran. 
 Photograph of the graveside of Nematollah Gorji at Behesht-e Zahra Cemetery, Tehran: .
 Derakht-e Golābi (The Pear Tree), IMDb: The Internet Movie Database.

People from Tehran
Iranian male film actors
Iranian people of Georgian descent
1926 births
2000 deaths
20th-century Iranian male actors